Goodbye is a 1918 British drama film directed by Maurice Elvey and starring Margaret Bannerman, Jessie Winter and Donald Calthrop. It was based on a novel by John Strange Winter. It is about a woman who pushes another couple towards divorce then marries the husband.

Cast
 Margaret Bannerman as Florence Tempest
 Jessie Winter as Hope Adair
 Donald Calthrop as Captain Richard Adair
 Douglas Munro as Bates
 Ruth Mackay as Rosalie
 Edward O'Neill as Frith
 Frank Dane as Doctor
 Fewlass Llewellyn as Lawyer

References

External links

1918 films
British silent feature films
1918 drama films
1910s English-language films
Films directed by Maurice Elvey
Films based on British novels
British drama films
British black-and-white films
1910s British films
Silent drama films